Bischofia is a genus of plants in the family Phyllanthaceae first described as a genus in 1827. It is native to southern China, the Indian Subcontinent, Queensland, New Guinea, and various islands of the Pacific. It is the only member of the tribe Bischofieae. They are dioecious, with male and female flowers on separate plants, but may rarely be monoecious.

The genus Bischofia was named after him by Karl Blume.
 
species
 Bischofia javanica Blume - S China, Taiwan, Ryukyu Is, Himalayas, India, Bangladesh, Assam, Andaman & Nicobar, Indochina, Malaysia, Indonesia, Philippines, Papuasia, Queensland, Fiji, Niue, Samoa, Tonga, Vanuatu, Cook Is, Society Is 
 Bischofia polycarpa (H.Lév.) Airy Shaw - China (Anhui, Fujian, Guangdong, Guangxi, Guizhou, Hunan, Jiangsu, Jiangxi, Shaanxi, Yunnan, Zhejiang)

References

Phyllanthaceae
Phyllanthaceae genera
Dioecious plants